The Shire of Leigh was a local government area about  west of Melbourne, the state capital of Victoria, Australia.

History

Leigh Shire was first incorporated as the Shelford Road District in 1861, and was renamed Leigh at the time of its redesignation as a shire on 22 March 1864.

On 6 May 1994, the Shire of Leigh was abolished, and along with the Shires of Bannockburn and Grenville, and parts of the Shire of Buninyong, was merged into the newly created Golden Plains Shire.

Wards

The Shire of Leigh was divided into three ridings in May 1965, each of which elected three councillors:
 East Riding
 Middle Riding
 West Riding

Towns and localities
 Corindhap
 Dereel
 Doroq
 Hesse
 Mount Mercer
 Rokewood*
 Shelford
 Teesdale
 Warrambeen
 Werneth
 Wingeel

* Council seat.

Population

* Estimate in 1958 Victorian Year Book.

References

External links
 Victorian Places - Leigh Shire

Leigh
1861 establishments in Australia